State Route 711 (SR 711), also known as the "Robert E. Hagan Memorial Highway" between its southern terminus and US 422, is a three-mile (5 km), four-lane, north–south, limited access freeway. It is located in Mahoning and Trumbull counties. Its termini are I-680 to the south and the I-80 / SR 11 interchange to the north.  The north-end ramps are directional, only serving travelers to and from the east via Interstate 80 and the north via State Route 11.

History
Local leaders first suggested a highway linking Girard and Youngstown in 1968. Originally the four-lane divided highway ended at US 422 and Burlington Street when it was completed in 1971.  Money wasn't made available for the US 422 to I-80 connector until 1999, and construction on the section began in 2002. The project was finished in 2005, opening October 24 of that year, with a total cost of about $60 million.

Exit list

References

Freeways in the United States
711
Transportation in Mahoning County, Ohio
Transportation in Trumbull County, Ohio